Frederique Bangue (born 31 December 1976 in Lyon) is a French sprinter who competed in the 100 metres. Her personal best being 11.16 seconds, she never reached a world-level final individually. However, when competing in the shorter distance of 60 metres (only held indoor) or relay races, she has won medals. She was the silver medallist at the 1997 Mediterranean Games.

Achievements

References

External links

1976 births
French female sprinters
Living people
Athletes from Lyon
French sportspeople of Cameroonian descent
World Athletics Championships medalists
World Athletics Indoor Championships medalists
European Athletics Championships medalists
Mediterranean Games gold medalists for France
Mediterranean Games medalists in athletics
Athletes (track and field) at the 1997 Mediterranean Games
20th-century French women